The Bua (also Boua) were a medieval Albanian tribe. The name is first attested in 14th-century historical documents as one of the Albanian tribes living in the Despotate of Epirus. Later on, the Bua settled southwards in the Peloponnese, and a part of them found refuge in Italy in the Arbëreshë migrations that followed the Ottoman conquest of the Balkans. A branch of the tribe regiments was ennobled in the Holy Roman Empire after its service in the Stratioti, a Balkan mercenary unit. Mercurio Bua (1478 –c. 1542), its most prominent member, was Count of Aquino and Roccasecca.

Name
Bua appears in historical record as both a given name and as a surname. It is often accompanied by the surname Spata. John VI Kantakouzenos's History written in second half of the 14th century is the first primary source about the Bua tribe. Kantakouzenos writes that the "Albanian tribes of Mazaraki, Bua, Malakasi were named so after the names of their leaders." Albanian clans traditionally bore the name of their first leader or progenitor, but after intermarriage between different leading families, the identification of the clans became intricate, as in the case of Muriki Bua Spata, who was perhaps the offspring of both Bua and Spata clans.

According to the Greek historian Constantine Sathas, the surname Bua derived from the name of the river Boiana / Buna in Albania and Montenegro, while poet Giuseppe Schirò suggested that the original form of the name was Buchia, from which stem the two forms Bugia and Bokoi. According to Schiró, from the latter derived the form Koboi attested in the Chronicle of the Tocco, and from the indefinite form Kobua, through apheresis of the initial syllable, ultimately derived Bua. Another possible derivation is from Albanian bua ('buffalo').

History 
They were semi-nomadic pastoralists, organized in katuns and had no central leadership. From that time, they appear in the history of the Despotate of Epirus and the involvement of Gjin Bua Shpata in the region. The Bua were not patrilineally kin (blood relatives) with the Spata tribe. The Meksi family is believed to be the first branch of Bua family. As a tribe, they were related to the Shpata via intermarriage. Many of the leaders of the Despotate of Arta appears with Bua as a second surname in historical record. As such, in historiography the Bua are considered to have been among the rulers of the Despotate of Arta and the regions of Aetolia and Acarnania to the south after the Battle of Achelous until 1416. After their loss, the Venetians invited the Bua tribe to settle in the Morea. In 1423, they appear in Venetian records in the Morea under the leadership of Rossus Bua, capu unius comitive Albanensium. The Bua tribe established in Morea amounted to about one or two thousand people in 1423.

After the fall of much of the Morea to the Ottomans, Venice invited them to settle in the Ionian Islands, in particular in Zakynthos in 1473. Many branches of them settled in Italy after 1479 as part of the Arbëreshë migrations. In Italy, many of them joined stratioti regiments. Between 1481 and 1570, at least 44 Buas appear as stratioti captains. Among them two Gjin, Gjon, Bardh Bua. The best known was Mercurio Bua who in time was ennobled. In modern Greece, in 1504 a branch of the Albanian tribe of Bua who remained in the Ionian Islands were part of the colonization of the abandoned island of Ithaca. The Boua-Grivas as they came to be known in the late 16th century produced the anti-Ottoman rebel and armatolos Theodore Boua-Grivas who started a revolt in Epirus and Acarnania in 1585 with Venetian support.

Members
Peter Bua ( 1450s), leader of the Albanian community in the Peloponnese after the fall of the Despotate of the Morea.
Theodore Bua ( 1479), Venetian mercenary captain
Mercurio Bua (1478–1542), Venetian mercenary captain, son of Peter Bua.
Andrés Bua, Stratiot of the Habsburg Empire of Charles V
Michele Bua, Stratioti captain in Flanders, France and Italy
Gianmattia Bua, italian businessman

Sources

Citations

Bibliography

Bua family
Medieval Albanian nobility
Tribes of Albania